ALL FM is a local community radio station serving south, central and east Manchester and based in the South Manchester suburb of Levenshulme. The station is run by paid staff and volunteers living in its coverage area.

ALL FM began in 2000 as a project of the charity Radio Regen, with a four-day broadcast under the title Radio Longsight. After the success of Radio Longsight, ALL FM was created, with station manager Dave Lenaghan, covering the Longsight area and the neighbouring areas of Ardwick and Levenshulme (hence the acronym ALL). As ALL FM, two RSL broadcasting licences were obtained, allowing ALL FM to transmit on a temporary basis.

In 2002, the station became part of the government's 'Access Radio' pilot scheme. ALL FM became an independent company and was granted a permanent broadcasting licence in 2005.

Catering to an area described by the founders as "one of the most multicultural outside London",. 
The wide variety of programming includes French, Cantonese, Persian, Polish, Portuguese, Spanish, Panjabi and Hindi.  In 2015 poet and broadcaster Lemn Sissay became patron of ALL FM.  He said he loved the diversity of the station and it was (as far as he knew) the only station to have played his track 'Architecture'. In 2019, international musician Aziz Ibrahim (guitarist who works with The Stone Roses & many other artists) took over as patron. All Fm has a proud record of gaining funding to train groups rarely heard on radio/podcasts, including diverse older people who record shows in residential homes, community centres as well as broadcasting live from the Stevie Fly studio at All Fm. A series of funded 'women-only' training programmes led to the launch, in 2021 of: 'WOMEN ON THE MIC' when All Fm became one of few radio stations with 50% women producers/presenters. In the same year it launched YOUNG MINDS a training programme and regular radio show produced by girls and young women aged 11 to 17. 
ALL FM's sister station WFM 97.2 broadcasts to the Wythenshawe area of Manchester, a few miles south of the ALL FM target area.

Awards
ALL FM took the Bronze medal in the Community Radio Association's Station of the Year award in 2018. 'The Innocent Ear' show won silver for Best Specialist Music Show. ALL FM won the 'Community Radio Station of the Year award' 2019-2020. In 2022 it gained the Queen's Award for voluntary service and it's 'Echo' show (Cantonese) serving the latest Hong Kong immigrant community, gained a gold award at the 2022 Community Radio Awards.

References

External links
ALL FM's website

Radio stations in Manchester
Community radio stations in the United Kingdom
Radio stations established in 2000